Darko Djukić (born 13 August 1980 in Ljubljana) is a Slovenian footballer who plays for St. Margareten.

Career
After establishing himself in his native Slovenia, Djukič signed with Israeli club Hapoel Nazareth Illit of the Israeli Premier League. He had a tough time acclimating to the club's style of play and was transferred to Bnei Sakhnin as a result. The clubs in Israel understood Djukič's reputation from Slovenia so regardless of the fact that he had yet to score in the country, he was transferred to Hapoel Be'er Sheva during the January transfer window. Be'er Sheva locked up the Slovenian striker just before he was set to agree terms with Hapoel Ra'anana.

External links
Player profile at PrvaLiga 

1980 births
Living people
Footballers from Ljubljana
Slovenian footballers
Association football forwards
Slovenian PrvaLiga players
NK Domžale players
NK Maribor players
NK Ljubljana players
FC Koper players
Slovenian expatriate footballers
Slovenian expatriate sportspeople in Israel
Expatriate footballers in Israel
Hapoel Nof HaGalil F.C. players
Bnei Sakhnin F.C. players
Hapoel Be'er Sheva F.C. players
Israeli Premier League players
ND Gorica players
NK Rudar Velenje players
Slovenian expatriate sportspeople in Albania
Expatriate footballers in Albania
Slovenian expatriate sportspeople in Austria
Expatriate footballers in Austria
Flamurtari Vlorë players